Gaston Ricci (11 February 1869 - 26 November 1952) was a French politician.

Ricci was born in Algiers, Algeria.  He represented the Democratic and Social Action in the Chamber of Deputies from 1928 to 1932.

References

External links
Assemble-ntionale.fr

1869 births
1952 deaths
People from Algiers
People of French Algeria
Pieds-Noirs
Democratic and Social Action politicians
Members of the 14th Chamber of Deputies of the French Third Republic